The 1962 winners of the Torneo di Viareggio (in English, the Viareggio Tournament, officially the Viareggio Cup World Football Tournament Coppa Carnevale), the annual youth football tournament held in Viareggio, Tuscany, are listed below.

Format
The 16 teams are organized in knockout rounds. The round of 16 are played in two-legs, while the rest of the rounds are single tie.

Participating teams

Italian teams

  Bologna
  Fiorentina
  Inter Milan
  Juventus
  L.R. Vicenza
  Milan
  Sampdoria
  Torino

European teams

  Partizan Beograd
  Rijeka
  Dinamo Zagreb
  Dukla Praha
  Progresul București
  CSKA Sofia
  Barcelona
  Budapest

Tournament fixtures

Champions

Footnotes

External links
 Official Site (Italian)
 Results on RSSSF.com

1962
1961–62 in Italian football
1961–62 in Yugoslav football
1961–62 in Romanian football
1961–62 in Spanish football
1961–62 in Czechoslovak football
1961–62 in Bulgarian football
1961–62 in Hungarian football